William Lawrence (September 2, 1814 – September 8, 1895) was a Senator, Congressman, and member of the United States House of Representatives from the 17th District of Ohio. He also served as President of the board of directors of the Ohio Penitentiary.

Lawrence was born in Washington, Guernsey County, Ohio. He graduated from Jefferson College (now Washington & Jefferson College) in Canonsburg, Pennsylvania in 1835.

After farming for a few years, Lawrence was elected to the Ohio House of Representatives in 1843. He was a Presidential elector in 1848 for Secretary of State Lewis Cass, and Congressman William Orlando Butler. He was a delegate to the Ohio State constitutional convention in 1851. From 1856 to 1857, he served in the Ohio Senate.

On March 4, 1857, William Lawrence (D) was inaugurated as the Representative from the 17th Congressional District of Ohio to the 35th U.S. Congress. Lawrence served only in this Congress, as he was elected only to one term in office. Upon leaving Congress, Lawrence served again in the Ohio Senate (in 1867, 1885, and 1886). 

He also served as president of the board of directors of the Ohio Penitentiary, a prison in downtown Columbus, Ohio.

William Lawrence died in Old Washington, Ohio on September 8, 1895, and is interred at the Washington Cemetery.

Lawrence was father of Ohio Attorney General James Lawrence.

References

External links 

1814 births
1895 deaths
Washington & Jefferson College alumni
People from Guernsey County, Ohio
Democratic Party Ohio state senators
Ohio Constitutional Convention (1850)
1848 United States presidential electors
Democratic Party members of the Ohio House of Representatives
19th-century American politicians
Democratic Party members of the United States House of Representatives from Ohio